The 1992 Philippine presidential and vice presidential elections were held on May 11, 1992. This was the first general election held under the 1987 Constitution. An estimated 80,000 candidates ran for 17,000 posts from the presidency down to municipal councilors.

The new constitution limited the president to a single six-year term with no possibility of reelection, even if nonsuccessive. Although some of President Corazon Aquino's advisers suggested that she could run for a second term, as she was sworn in before the 1987 Constitution took effect, Aquino did not run again.

In the presidential election, retired general Fidel Ramos of Lakas–NUCD narrowly defeated populist candidate Miriam Defensor Santiago of the People's Reform Party. Ramos also got the lowest plurality in the Philippine electoral history, and beat the previous election for the closest margin of victory, percentage-wise (this record would later be beaten by the 2004 election).

Santiago led the canvassing of votes for the first five days but then was overtaken by Ramos in a few days. Santiago cried fraud and filed an electoral protest citing power outages as evidence. Various media personnel became witnesses to the fraud made in the election, where the phrase, 'Miriam won in the election, but lost in the counting' became popular. However, her protest was eventually dismissed by the Supreme Court of the Philippines.

The 1992 election was the second time both president and vice president came from different parties. Movie actor and Senator Joseph Estrada, running with presidential candidate Eduardo Cojuanco, won a six-year term as vice-president.

Under the transitory provisions of the Constitution, 24 senators were elected in this election. The first 12 senators who garnered the highest votes would have six-year terms while the next 12 senators would have three-year terms. Laban ng Demokratikong Pilipino (LDP) received a large share in the Senate race. Television personality and Quezon City vice mayor Vicente Sotto III (also known as Tito Sotto) received the highest number of votes.

Candidates

Debates
A debate was held between presidential candidates Salvador Laurel and Ramon Mitra Jr. on the ABS-CBN television program Magandang Gabi... Bayan on March 7, 1992. It was considered an especially heated debate between the two candidates, with the Manila Standard noting the "barbs, insults, and witticisms" exchanged during the program.

On March 15, the Commission on Elections (COMELEC) began its series of six presidential and vice-presidential debates held over the next six Sundays, with the first debate held among presidential candidates Fidel V. Ramos, Miriam Defensor-Santiago, and Jovito Salonga, moderated by Dong Puno and broadcast live on GMA Network. Estrada, then a presidential candidate, was scheduled to participate in the debate but had to withdraw due to a prior commitment.

The second COMELEC-sponsored presidential debate was held on March 22 among Laurel, Mitra, and Eduardo Cojuangco Jr., moderated by Puno and broadcast live on RPN. The debate was also broadcast live on radio through the government-owned Radyo ng Bayan, but was interrupted 45 minutes into the debate when the station switched instead to a broadcast of a Lakas-NUCD rally in Dumaguete led by President Aquino.

The first vice-presidential debate as set by COMELEC was held on March 29 among Marcelo Fernan, Ramon Magsaysay Jr., and Vicente Magsaysay, moderated by Mario C. Garcia and broadcast live on the government-owned PTV.

Results

For President

Breakdown

For Vice President

See also
Commission on Elections
Politics of the Philippines
Philippine elections
President of the Philippines
9th Congress of the Philippines
1992 Philippine general election

References

External links
The Philippine Presidency Project
Official website of the Commission on Elections
Official website of the House of Representatives

Further reading
 
 

1992 elections in the Philippines
1992